Barbara Culver (later Barbara Culver Clack) (1926–2016) was a justice of the Texas Supreme Court.

Culver was born in Dallas, Texas in 1926 and graduated from Texas Tech University in 1947. She practiced law together in Midland, Texas with her first husband John Culver for ten years following their graduation from the Southern Methodist University Law School in 1951. She was initially hired to read law for Culver, a World War II veteran who was determined to study law despite losing his eyesight during wartime. However, due to the volume of work, she decided to earn a law degree too.

In 1962, upon being elected as the Judge of Midland County, she became the first Republican (and female) to hold and oversee a county office in Midland. Due to how the county’s court system was constructed, Culver headed the commissioner’s court and presided over matters that included probate proceedings. On February 1, 1988, Culver became the second female appointed as a justice of the Texas Supreme Court. She ran for election to keep in her seat in November of that same year, but lost to Jack Hightower. Culver remained on the bench until December 7, 1988. It was also in 1988 that Culver married her second husband James H. Clack, a retired judge. The Justice Barbara Culver Juvenile Justice Center, originally called the Culver Youth Home, in Midland, Texas was re-named in her honor after it was expanded.

She died on September 12, 2016.

See also
 List of justices of the Texas Supreme Court

References

1926 births
2016 deaths
20th-century American judges
20th-century American lawyers
20th-century American women lawyers
Lawyers from Dallas
Southern Methodist University alumni
Texas lawyers
Texas Republicans
Justices of the Texas Supreme Court
20th-century American women judges